Lake Worth is a Tri-Rail commuter rail station in Lake Worth Beach, Florida, at the confluence of Lake Worth Road (SR 802) and Interstate 95.  Opening to service January 9, 1989, parking is available at this station, all of which is beneath I-95 on the south side of Lake Worth Road.

Station layout
The station has two side platforms and a parking lot east of the northbound platform, located underneath the Interstate 95 overpass. Access to the station is from the northbound platform, with an overpass connecting to the southbound platform.

Accidents and incidents
On January 4, 2016, A Tri-Rail passenger train derailed after colliding with a garbage truck which had broken down on a grade crossing. Twenty-two people were injured.

References

External links
South Florida Regional Transportation Authority - Lake Worth station
 Station from Google Maps Street View

Buildings and structures in Lake Worth Beach, Florida
Tri-Rail stations in Palm Beach County, Florida
Railway stations in the United States opened in 1989
1989 establishments in Florida